Hamilton Morris (born April 14, 1987) is an American journalist, documentarian, and scientific researcher. He is the creator and director of the television series Hamilton's Pharmacopeia, in which he investigates the chemistry, history, and cultural impact of various psychoactive drugs.

Biography 
Hamilton Morris was born in New York City, the son of Julia Sheehan, an art historian, and documentary filmmaker Errol Morris. He was raised in Cambridge, Massachusetts. As a teenager, Morris appeared in television commercials, notably a 2002 advertisement for the first-generation iPod. He attended the University of Chicago and The New School, where he studied anthropology and chemistry. He began writing for Vice magazine as a college sophomore, creating a monthly print column titled "Hamilton's Pharmacopeia" that evolved into a series of articles and documentaries for VBS.tv focused on the science of psychoactive drugs. He is a correspondent and producer for Vice on HBO, as well as a contributor to Harper's Magazine. Morris frequently consults with media on the subject of psychoactive drugs and conducts pharmacological research at Saint Joseph's University in Philadelphia with an emphasis on the synthesis and history of dissociative anesthetics.

Projects

Video
 The Sapo Diary: Phyllomedusa bicolor skin secretions in Amazonia
 Nzambi: Wade Davis's theory of TTX-mediated zombification in Haiti
 High on Krystle: An exploration of the clandestine laboratory once operated by William Leonard Pickard
 SiHKAL: Shulgins I Have Known and Loved (with Alexander Shulgin & Ann Shulgin)
 The Icelandic Skin Disease Mushroom Fiasco 
 Hamilton Morris and the Philosopher's Stone: Psilocybin-containing sclerotium laboratories in The Netherlands
 Tanks for the Memories: An exploration of sensory deprivation tanks with Joe Rogan
 The Ambien Effect
 Swaziland: Gold Mine of Marijuana
 Efavirenz as a classical psychedelic
 Chinese synthetic cannabinoid laboratories
 Businesses involved in the ongoing legalization of Cannabis in the United States

Hamilton's Pharmacopeia, Viceland
SEASON 1
 The Story of the South African Quaalude
 A Positive PCP Story
 Shepherdess: The Story of Salvia Divinorum
Magic Mushrooms in Mexico
 Fish n' Trips
 The Lazy Lizard School of Hedonism
SEASON 2
 The Psychedelic Toad
Peyote: The Divine Messenger
Kratom: The Forbidden Leaf
 Wizards of DMT
Ketamine: Realms and Realities
 A Clandestine Chemist's Tale
 A Fungal Fairy Tale
 The Cactus Apprentice
SEASON 3
 Synthetic Toad Venom Machine
 A Positive Methamphetamine Story
 Xenon: The Perfect Anesthetic?
 Synthetic Ibogaine-Natural Tramadol
 Bufotenine: In Search of Hataj
 Ultra LSD

Podcast 

 The Hamilton Morris Podcast (some freely available, some on Patreon)

References 

1987 births
Living people
People from Cambridge, Massachusetts
Writers from Manhattan
The New School alumni
University of Chicago alumni
Jewish American journalists
American male journalists
Journalists from New York City
Drug culture
American psychedelic drug advocates
21st-century American Jews